Sail On may refer to:
 Sail On (Imperials album), 1977
 Sail On (Muddy Waters album)
 Sail On: The 30th Anniversary Collection, a 2004 album by Kansas
 "Sail On" (song), a 1979 song by the Commodores from Midnight Magic